"I'm Sitting on Top of the World" is a popular song with music written by Ray Henderson and lyrics by Sam M. Lewis and Joe Young. It was published in 1925. It is now in the public domain.

The song was most likely first recorded by Art Gillham (‘the Whispering Pianist’), who recorded ‘I'm Sitting on Top of the World’ on 24 October 1925. Al Jolson's recording was made on December 21, 1925. Jolson sang it in the 1928 part-talkie film The Singing Fool and in his biographical movie The Jolson Story in 1946, where it was lip-synced by actor Larry Parks. 

Popular recordings in 1926 were by Jolson, Roger Wolfe Kahn and His Hotel Biltmore Orchestra, and by Frank Crumit.

Notable cover versions 

Notable interpretations have been recorded by these performers:

Bobby Darin
Doris Day - for the album Cuttin' Capers (1959).
The Four Aces with the Jack Pleis Orchestra
Aretha Franklin recorded the song for her album The Tender, the Moving, the Swinging Aretha Franklin (1962).
Dizzy Gillespie
Roger Wolfe Kahn and His Hotel Biltmore Orchestra
Brenda Lee - included in her album Brenda, That's All (1962)
Jerry Lewis
Taj Mahal & Corey Harris
Dean Martin - for his album Sittin' on Top of the World (1973)
Les Paul and Mary Ford - reached no. 10 in the Billboard charts in 1953.
Carl Perkins
Frank Sinatra

Appearances of the song 
Jolson's recording (1926) was played:
 In the closing sequence of Richard Loncraine's film Richard III (1995).
 During the opening montage of 1930s New York City in the 2005 remake of King Kong.
 As part of the soundtrack of Woody Allen's film Zelig (1983).

Legacy
Additionally, the song "I'm On My Way" by The Proclaimers makes reference to the song, saying "I'd have Al Jolson sing 'I'm sittin' on top of the world'."

References 

Songs with music by Ray Henderson
Songs with lyrics by Sam M. Lewis
Songs with lyrics by Joe Young (lyricist)
Al Jolson songs
1925 songs